The siege of Tyre was waged by Nebuchadnezzar II of Babylon for 13 years from 586 to 573 BC. The siege of Tyre, in Phoenicia, has a significant connection to the Book of Ezekiel where it was mentioned that the city had fallen to Babylonian forces after a years-long siege.

Background 

King Nebuchadnezzar II of the Neo-Babylonian Empire began a campaign of wars in the Near East to solidify his control over the region in the 600s BC after the fall of Assyria. He defeated the Egyptian Army under Pharaoh Necho II in the Battle of Carchemish in 605 BC. Nebuchadnezzar II subjugated Jerusalem in a siege twice: the first siege in 597 BC toppled King Jeconiah and replaced him with Zedekiah, and the second siege from 589 to 586 BC destroyed the Kingdom of Judah and overthrew Zedekiah.

Siege 

Little of what occurred during the siege is known as ancient sources regarding the siege do not mention much or have been lost. According to accounts by Saint Jerome in his Commentary on Ezekiel, Nebuchadnezzar II was unable to attack the city with conventional methods, such as using battering rams or siege engines, since Tyre was an island city, so he ordered his soldiers to gather rocks and build a causeway from the mainland to the walls of the island, similar to Alexander the Great's strategy in his siege 250 years later.

After 13 years of siege, the Tyrians negotiated a surrender with the Babylonians. Nebuchadnezzar II was never able to take control of Tyre by military means, leaving the result of the siege as militarily inconclusive. The King of Tyre, Ithobaal III, either died near the end of the siege or was replaced as part of the surrender. He was succeeded by Baal II, who ruled as a vassal to Babylon.

The historicity of the siege was supported by a cuneiform tablet discovered in 1926 by German archeologist Eckhard Unger that discussed food provisions for "the king and his soldiers for their march against Tyre." Other cuneiform tablets also confirm that Tyre came under the control of Nebuchadnezzar II at some point during his reign. Josephus briefly mentions the siege in Antiquities of the Jews (Book X).

Biblical connections 
Chapters 26 to 29 of the Book of Ezekiel allude to the siege of Tyre. Passages in these chapters are referred to as "Proclamation Against Tyre," "Lamentation for Tyre," "Proclamation Against the King of Tyre," "Lamentation for the King of Tyre" and "Proclamation Against Egypt".

Ezekiel 26:3-4 states:

The chapter continues:

The description of Nebuchadnezzar's siege in chapter 26 was a prophecy made by the Prophet Ezekiel to the fate of Tyre. Christians and Jews claim that Nebuchadnezzar would only fulfill part of this prophecy, and that the rest would be fulfilled after Alexander's siege.

The structure of Ezekiel chapter 27 may suggest that the Tyrians suffered heavily either during or after the siege, losing many men and luxuries to the Babylonians. Chapter 28 begins as a condemnation of the King of Tyre but later shifts to a lamentation to the King of Tyre. The last verse of the chapter, verse 19, reads "All who knew you among the peoples are astonished at you; You have become a horror, and shall be no more forever" which may allude to the King, Ithobaal III, having been killed.

In chapter 29 of Ezekiel, 16 years after the setting of chapter 26 and after the siege, it is stated that Nebuchadnezzar was not successful in taking New Tyre, though he did manage to subjugate them in formal terms.

The statement, "Every head was made bald, and every soldier rubbed raw", could be interpreted to mean that the siege did not end in a decisive victory for the Babylonians and that heavy casualties may have been suffered.

Structure

The structure of chapters 26 and 27 reflect the typical Ezekielian "halving" which is a signature of the prophet. The same pattern of a literal section followed by a lament is used in both chapters 26, 27 and in the two sections of chapter 28, verses 1-10 and 11-19. According to Moshe Greenberg and Daniel Block, it is typical for Ezekiel to use this Diptych structure.

According to Block, the lament of chapter 27 is also internally structured as a diptych:

See also 

List of Sieges of Tyre
Siege of Jerusalem (587 BC)

References

Bibliography 

Tyre
Tyre
History of Tyre, Lebanon
Nebuchadnezzar II
586 BC
573 BC
Tyre
Book of Ezekiel